Muirgheas is a masculine given name in the Irish language. The name is composed of two elements: the first, muir, means "sea"; the second element, gus, means "choice". The name has been Anglicised to the etymologically unrelated Maurice. A contracted form of the name is Muiris (which is also a form of Maurice in Irish).

People with the name
Muirgheas mac Aedh, (died 1021), Irish, king of Uí Díarmata
Muirgheas Ua Cú Ceannainn, (died 1106), Irish, king of Uí Díarmata
Muirgheas Ua hEidhin, (died 1180), Irish, king of Uí Fiachrach Aidhne

See also
List of Irish-language given names

References

Irish-language masculine given names